Drugchu (Hbrugchu, Zhugchu) is a Tibetic language of Gansu spoken by a few hundred or thousand people.

Phonology

References

Bodic languages
Languages of China